The 1979 Central Michigan Chippewas football team was an American football team that represented Central Michigan University during the 1979 NCAA Division I-A football season. In their second season under head coach Herb Deromedi, the Chippewas compiled a 10–0–1 record, won the Mid-American Conference championship, and outscored all opponents by a combined total of 291 to 133. The team played its home games in Perry Shorts Stadium in Mount Pleasant, Michigan, with attendance of 101,705 in five home games.

The team's statistical leaders were Gary Hogeboom with 1,404 passing yards, Willie Todd with 1,003 rushing yards, and Mike Ball with 457 receiving yards. Hogeboom was selected as the team's most valuable player and as the MAC Offensive Player of the Year. Seven Central Michigan players (OT Marty Smallbone, WR Mike Ball, RB Willie Todd, QB Gary Hogeboom, DT Bill White, DB Robert Jackson, and LB Tim Hollandsworth) received first-team All-MAC honors.

Schedule

References

Central Michigan
Central Michigan Chippewas football seasons
Mid-American Conference football champion seasons
College football undefeated seasons
Central Michigan Chippewas football